Hypericum asplundii is a species of flowering plant in the family Hypericaceae. It is endemic to Ecuador, where it is known from a single collection made outside of Machachi.

Sources

asplundii
Endemic flora of Ecuador
Taxonomy articles created by Polbot